S. D. Ugamchand (died 2018) was an Indian politician and Member of the Legislative Assembly of Tamil Nadu. He was elected to the Tamil Nadu legislative assembly from Maduranthakam constituency as an Anna Dravida Munnetra Kazhagam candidate in 1980, and 1989 elections. He Joined  Dravida Munnetra Kazhagam He was also the Chairman of Tamil Nadu Water Board and Tamil Nadu Warehouse Corporation.

References 

Members of the Tamil Nadu Legislative Assembly
2018 deaths
Year of birth missing
All India Anna Dravida Munnetra Kazhagam politicians
Dravida Munnetra Kazhagam politicians